Stefanos Ntouskos (born 29 March 1997) is a Greek competitive rower. He won a gold medal in the men's single sculls, at the 2020 Summer Olympics.

He previously competed at the 2016 Summer Olympics in Rio de Janeiro, in the men's lightweight coxless four, finishing in the sixth place.

References

External links

1997 births
Living people
Greek male rowers
Olympic rowers of Greece
Rowers at the 2016 Summer Olympics
Rowers at the 2020 Summer Olympics
Mediterranean Games gold medalists for Greece
Mediterranean Games medalists in rowing
Competitors at the 2018 Mediterranean Games
Rowers from Ioannina
Medalists at the 2020 Summer Olympics
Olympic gold medalists for Greece
Olympic medalists in rowing
21st-century Greek people